Trichoptilus inclitus is a moth of the family Pterophoridae that is found in Australia.

External links
Australian Faunal Directory
Australian Insects

Moths of Australia
Oxyptilini
Moths described in 1892
Endemic fauna of Australia